Cimmerites is a genus of beetles in the family Carabidae, containing the following species:

 Cimmerites aibgensis Belousov, 1998
 Cimmerites convexus Belousov, 1998
 Cimmerites elegans Belousov, 1998
 Cimmerites grandis Belousov, 1998
 Cimmerites kryzhanovskii Belousov, 1998
 Cimmerites kurnakovi Jeannel, 1960
 Cimmerites morozovi Dolzhanski & Ljovuschkin, 1990
 Cimmerites ovatus Belousov, 1998
 Cimmerites serrulatus Winkler, 1926
 Cimmerites similis Belousov, 1998
 Cimmerites subcylindricus Belousov, 1998
 Cimmerites vagabundus Belousov, 1998
 Cimmerites zamotajlovi Belousov, 1998

References 

Trechinae
Carabidae genera